International Networks is the name given by the International Telecommunication Union (ITU) to country calling codes +882 and +883, and serves as a catch-all for telephone services not dedicated to a single country. Satellite telephone carriers, especially those with worldwide service, are allocated within the Global Mobile Satellite System (GMSS), country code +881, with the exception of non-terrestrial Inmarsat, country code 870.

As in the other such shared country codes, carriers are allocated number space within this code space plus their identification code (two-digit number in 882 code space, three or four digit number in 883 code space). The phone number for a subscriber of such a service starts with +882/+883 followed by the carrier code.

The cost to call such a number can be high; for example in the British Telecom price list rates for various 882 and 883 numbers ranged from £0.60 to £4.50 per minute.

Carrier codes
As of November 27, 2017 the assignments of +882/+883 carrier codes are as follows:

Active

In the +882-99 block, two numbering spaces collide: The numbering area has officially been assigned to Telenor but prior to this assignment, e164.org started to assign unofficial numbers within that numbering area.

Inactive
The following codes were previously assigned by the ITU but were not used as of 2007:

References

External links
iNum OFFICIAL Website
Voxbone, the company behind iNUM creation
World Telephone Numbering Guide: Special Services
ITU-T SG2 NCT: E.164 country code 882 plus one 2-digit IC
List of ITU-T Recommendation E.164 assigned country codes

Country codes